Lasówki  is a village in western Poland, in the administrative district of Gmina Grodzisk Wielkopolski, 3 km northwest of the town, situated on the road to Nowy Tomyśl. It houses the local Forest District Administration and has many new buildings.
Separated from the woodland area is a landscape park (12.20 hectares) with several old trees. An eclectic villa (rather a hunting manor house), dating from around 1880-1890s, has been preserved. Further west, in the forest, is a large tree nursery.

References

Villages in Grodzisk Wielkopolski County